Walsh Glacier is a tributary glacier in the central part of Wilson Hills. It drains east-northeast along the south side of Goodman Hills to enter the lower part of Tomilin Glacier. 

The glacier was mapped by the United States Geological Survey (USGS) from surveys and U.S. Navy air photos taken from 1960–64. It was named by the Advisory Committee on Antarctic Names (US-ACAN) for Gary Walsh, a United States Antarctic Research Program (USARP) biologist at Hallett Station from 1968–69.

Glaciers of Oates Land